Thembelani Waltermade Nxesi (born 1 January 1959), popularly known as Thulas Nxesi, is a South African politician. A member of the South African Communist Party and the African National Congress, he is the Minister of Employment and Labour. He was previously Minister of Public Works, Minister of Sports and Recreation, served a different term as Minister of Public Works, and was Deputy Minister of Rural Development and Land Reform. He also serves as the deputy national chairperson of the South African Communist Party.

Education
Nxesi holds a Bachelor of Arts degree from the University of Fort Hare obtained in 1983; a Bachelor of Education degree from Witwatersrand University and a Higher Diploma in Education from the University of South Africa (UNISA).

Career
His political career began as a student activist and leader in the UDF-aligned SANSCO (South African National Student Congress) and its predecessor, AZASO (Azanian Students Organisation).

In 1985 he took up a teaching position in Tembisa, Gauteng at the Ikusasa Senior Secondary School, where he headed the Social Studies department from 1985 until 1990.  Additionally, he was a founder member and national leader of NEUSA (National Education Union of South Africa). In 1990 he was elected Assistant General Secretary of the newly formed SADTU (South African Democratic Teachers Union), and in 1995 became General Secretary, a position he held until 2009. During this period, SADTU grew in membership from 30,000 to a quarter of a million.

During this time he was increasingly active in Education International (EI) – with 30 million affiliated members worldwide; and served as president from 2004 to 2009, when he was also a member of the Global Unions Council.

In 2009, Nxesi was released by SADTU and COSATU to apply to stand for election to Parliament on the ANC list. As a Member of Parliament, he served as Chair of the Portfolio Committee on International Relations and Cooperation, during which time he participated in several study tours and overseas missions focusing on human rights.

In November 2010, President Jacob Zuma appointed him to the post of Deputy Minister of Rural Development and Land Reform, where he was given responsibilities including: restitution claims, gender issues, HRD and communications. A year later, in October 2011, the Zuma appointed him Minister of Public Works.

In March 2017 he was appointed Minister of Sport. He named his top priorities as the acceleration of transformation and the revival of school sport in the country. He also promised to build on the work of his predecessors, namely Steve Tshwete and Fikile Mbalula.

He was denied a visa to enter Israel in 2012 over pro-Palestinian stance

References

1959 births
Government ministers of South Africa
African National Congress politicians
Living people
South African Ministers for Sport and Recreation
21st-century South African politicians
Members of the National Assembly of South Africa